Sky Gabon was a cargo airline based in Libreville, Gabon. Its main base was Libreville International Airport. The airline was on the list of air carriers banned in the European Union. In 2019 the airline ceased all operations.

Destinations
Sky Gabon operated the following services:

Douala - Douala International Airport

Malabo - Malabo International Airport

Libreville - Libreville International Airport
Port-Gentil - Port-Gentil International Airport

Pointe Noire - Pointe Noire Airport

Fleet
Sky Gabon leased a Fokker F27-400 in 2013.

References

External links

Defunct airlines of Gabon
Airlines established in 2006
Airlines disestablished in 2019
Defunct cargo airlines
Companies based in Libreville
Gabonese companies established in 2006